Diego Alegre Gil (born 22 March 1982 in Valencia) is a Spanish retired footballer who played as a right-back.

Honours
Spain U16
UEFA European Under-16 Championship: 1999

References

External links

Queso Mecánico biography and stats 

1982 births
Living people
Spanish footballers
Footballers from Valencia (city)
Association football defenders
Segunda División players
Segunda División B players
Valencia CF Mestalla footballers
Sporting de Gijón players
Ciudad de Murcia footballers
Albacete Balompié players
UB Conquense footballers
Ontinyent CF players
Spain youth international footballers